Polysoma lithochrysa is a moth of the family Gracillariidae. It is known from South Africa, Uganda and Zimbabwe.

References

External links
Africamuseum.be: images of P.lithochrysa

Gracillariinae
Lepidoptera of Uganda
Lepidoptera of Zimbabwe
Moths of Sub-Saharan Africa
Moths described in 1930